Vladimir Vladimirovich Benedsky (born 19 June 1970 in Grozny) is a former Russian football player.

References

1970 births
Sportspeople from Grozny
Living people
Soviet footballers
FC Akhmat Grozny players
FC APK Morozovsk players
Russian footballers
FC Dynamo Stavropol players
Russian Premier League players
FC Amkar Perm players
FC KAMAZ Naberezhnye Chelny players

Association football defenders